Coliseum station is an Edmonton Light Rail Transit station in Edmonton, Alberta, Canada. It serves the Capital Line. It is located at 78 Street and 118 Avenue, near Northlands Coliseum, and is built on an overpass above 118 Avenue (Alberta Avenue).

History
The station is one of the original five stations, and opened on April 22, 1978.

Although Coliseum was never a terminus of the LRT line, all trains started and ended their runs at Coliseum when the fleet of LRT rail cars was maintained at the Cromdale garage nearby. The fleet is now housed at the D.L. MacDonald Transit Yard, which was completed in December 1983.

Station layout
The station has a  centre loading platform that can accommodate two five-car LRT trains at the same time, with one train on each side of the platform.  The platform is just under eight metres wide, which is narrow by current Edmonton LRT design guidelines.

Public art
The public art for Coliseum Station is a mural entitled "People on the Move" painted by Works 2 Works students.

Future developments
The Coliseum station sits adjacent to Northlands exhibition lands. Plans to redevelop the lands include relocating the existing Coliseum station further north. More detailed plans and public engagement are scheduled for late 2019.

Around the station
Northlands Coliseum
Bellevue
Edmonton Expo Centre
Eastwood
Elmwood Park
K-Days (July)
Northlands Park

Coliseum Transit Centre

The Coliseum Transit Centre is located on the west side of the LRT station. It is connected to the north end of the station by a pedestrian underpass below the station. This transit centre has few amenities, only having a pay phone. More amenities are available in the neighboring LRT station including washrooms and a snack shop.

The following bus routes serve the transit centre:

The above list does not include LRT services from the adjacent LRT station.

References

Edmonton Light Rail Transit stations
Railway stations in Canada opened in 1978
Edmonton Transit Service transit centres
Capital Line